Tibbs may refer to:
 They Call Me Mister Tibbs!, a movie sequel
 TIBBS, a bulletin board system
 Tibbs (surname), a surname

See also 
 Tibb's Eve, a regional holiday in Newfoundland
 Evans-Tibbs House, historic residence of Lillian Evans Tibbs in Washington, D.C.
 Tibs (disambiguation)